The 1978–79 Segunda División season saw 20 teams participate in the second flight Spanish league. AD Almería, CD Málaga and Real Betis were promoted to Primera División. Real Jaén, Terrassa FC, Barakaldo CF and Racing de Ferrol were relegated to Segunda División B.

Teams

Final table

Results

Pichichi Trophy for top goalscorers

External links 
  Official LFP Site

Segunda División seasons
2
Spain